Santrampur, which used to be known as Brahampuri, is a town in Mahisagar District, Gujarat, India. It serves as the administrative headquarters for Santrampur tehsil and is located on the banks of the Suki river in the lap of the Aravalli hills.

As of 2011, Santrampur had a population of almost 19,000 people. The town is known for its historical tower built in the western part of the city. An open-air market, called Haat bazaar, take place on every Tuesday in the town. The town houses various heritage buildings, administrator offices and educational institutions.

History
। Santrampur was originally ruled by Bhil King,  Rajputs by intrigue defeated the Bhil kings and established the Suntha State ( Santrampur ),  
King Zalam Sinh of Malwa dynasty established his kingdom in Jhalod in the 11th century. Folklore variously suggests that they came from Chandravati town at Mount Abu or from Dhar State of Madhya Pradesh. The king died during attacks by Muslims and the Kunwars of him, Sant and Limdev left Jhalod with a handful of warriors to settle in the hilly areas where Bhil people were lived and were dominant. Sant and Limdev lived in these forests for many years, gradually asserting their position and developing their kingdom by making Sunth or Sant as a capital of their state in 1255. It became Sant State, recognised as princely state in western India during the colonial British Raj era.

Geography

It is the town with an area of 16 square kilometers and a population of 19,445, according to the 2010–11 census. The town sits on the banks of the Suki River, in central Gujarat. The Suki river frequently dries up in the summer, leaving only a small stream of water.

The three borders of Santrampur known as Pratappura, Sant and Navi Vasahat.

Civic Administration

Santrampur is administered by the Nagarpalika. The Nagarpalika was established in April 1994 under the Gujarat Municipalities Act - 1963. For administrative purposes, the city is divided into six wards. The principal responsibility of Nagarpalika to ensure an overall development of the Santrampur agglomeration covering an area of 16 km2. Four corporators are elected from each ward, who in turn elect a president. Executive powers are vested in the chief officer, who is an officer appointed by the Gujarat state government. Nagarpalika is responsible for Water supply, Hospitals, Roads, Street lighting, Drainage, Fire brigade, Market places, Records of births and deaths, Solid waste management, Maintaining gardens, parks and playgrounds, Providing education to unprivileged children etc. The Santrampur Police Station is headed by a Police Inspector (PI), appointed by Government of Gujarat.

The City elects One member to the Lok Sabha (parliament), which comes under Dahod (Lok Sabha constituency) and One to the Gujarat Vidhan Sabha (Assembly), which comes under Santrampur (Vidhan Sabha constituency). One assembly seat of Santrampur was won by the BJP during the legislative elections in 2017. In the 2018 Nagarpalika elections, the BJP won 14 seats, 5 seats went to the Congress and 5 to others.

Demographics

 India census, Santrampur had a population of 19,465. Population of Children with age of 0-6 is 2511 which is 12.90% of total population of Santrampur. In Santrampur, Female Sex Ratio is of 934 against state average of 919. Literacy rate of Santrampur city is 84.99% higher than state average of 78.03%. In Santrampur, Male literacy is around 91.58% while female literacy rate is 78.03%.

References

Cities and towns in Mahisagar district